Mikhail Yaroslavich Khorobrit (The Brave) was Prince of Moscow (1246–1248) and Grand Prince of Vladimir in 1248.  He was a younger brother of Aleksandr Nevsky and he and his son, Boris Mikhailovich, are sometimes said to have been princes of Moscow before Daniil Aleksandrovich, although this is not always accepted.  In 1248, he seized the town of Vladimir and expelled Grand Prince Sviatoslav Vsevolodovich, his uncle, who fled to Yuriev-Polsky.  Mikhail was killed fighting the nephews of the Lithuanian King Mindaugas, Tautvilas and Gedivydas, at the Battle of Protva on 15 January 1248.

See also
Rulers of Russia family tree

References

Year of birth missing
1248 deaths
13th-century Grand Princes of Moscow
Grand Princes of Moscow
Grand Princes of Vladimir
Rurik dynasty
Yurievichi family
Eastern Orthodox monarchs
13th-century princes in Kievan Rus'
Monarchs killed in action